Abu al-Walid (full name : Abdulaziz bin Omar Al-Ghamidi transliterated also known as Abu al-Waleed and also called Abu al-Walid al-Ghamdi or simply Abu Walid; 1967 – 16 April 2004) was a Saudi Arabian of the Ghamd tribe who fought as a "mujahid" volunteer in Central Asia, the Balkans, and the North Caucasus. He was killed in April 2004 in Chechnya by the Russian federal forces.

Al-Walid was one of the most prominent Arabs fighting in Chechnya. In 2002 he took over as emir (commander) of an autonomous unit, composed mostly of non-Chechen mujahideen, following the death of Ibn al-Khattab on 20 March 2002.

Abu al-Walid was accused by Russians of terrorist attacks on civilians, and alleged to be an agent of Saudi intelligence, the Muslim Brotherhood, or Bin Laden's al-Qaeda. He never responded or admitted to any of the charges, but condemned abuses by Russian forces in Chechnya.

Identity 
During his lifetime, al-Walid stayed out of the spotlight. His predecessor, Ibn al-Khattab (more commonly known as Khattab), was known to have a personal camera crew of two who followed him into combat. Speculation arose about al-Walid's identity, whereabouts and actions, and occasionally there were rumours of his death. A persistent rumour was that he had drowned in June 2002, carried off on his horse after trying to ford a river. Russian officials announced his death at least seven times. At one point, even his very existence was deemed doubtful.

On 23 June 2002, his family gave an interview to the Saudi newspaper Al-Watan, telling much about his background. They said his full given name was Abd Al-Aziz Bin Ali Bin Said Al Said Al-Ghamdi.

Biography

Early life 
Al-Walid was raised in the village of al-Hal, near the city of Baljorashi in Saudi Arabia's Al Bahah Province. In his native village, his father was a well known imam. The boy was born into a large family as one of eleven sons. His brothers claimed that in his youth, al-Walid had enjoyed acting, reading religious books and studying the Quran.

Afghanistan, Bosnia and Tajikistan 
In 1986, when he was 19 years old, al-Walid obtained his parents' permission to participate in jihad in Afghanistan. He soon left for the country to join the mujahideen in their fight against the Russian forces during the Soviet–Afghan War. The next two years he spent training at the Maktab al-Khidamat, an organization created by Abdullah Azzam and Osama bin Laden. They trained the international volunteers and distributed funds to Islamic groups. Upon completing his training, al-Walid was assigned to a combat unit where he started fighting. On two occasions he briefly returned to Saudi Arabia, once to have an injury to his left hand treated.

After the end of the Afghan War, al-Walid went on to fight in other conflicts in Europe and Asia. In the 1990s, the movement would lead him to the Balkans, specifically to Bosnia where he fought alongside the Bosniaks in the Bosnian War; he then travelled to Tajikistan, where he assisted the Islamist rebels in the Tajik Civil War; and eventually to Chechnya, where he joined the band called the Chechen mujahideen. This group had been organized by and was being led by Ibn al-Khattab.

First Chechen War 
In the First Chechen War, al-Walid served as a Naib (deputy) in Khattab's unit. He participated in the numerous raids and ambushes that were executed by the IIB, including the April 1996 Shatoy ambush, in which they attacked and destroyed a large Russian armoured column.

Interwar period and Dagestan War 
After the war, he remained in Chechnya along with most of the battalion It concentrated on setting up a network of camps in the mountainous South of the country, in which they trained Islamist rebels from throughout the region, and recruits from abroad.

He married a Chechen woman. They had two children together.

On 22 December 1997 al-Walid participated in a surprise attack on the base of the 136th Armoured Brigade of the Russian Army, stationed in Buynaksk, Dagestan. This raid contributed to the growing tensions between Moscow and the newly formed government of the Chechen Republic of Ichkeria.

In 1999 he participated in the Islamic International Peacekeeping Brigade’s invasion of Dagestan, which helped catalyze the Second Chechen War. During this conflict, Khattab's first deputy Hakim al-Medani was killed. Analysts believe that after al-Medani's death, al-Walid was promoted to the position of first deputy. Before the events of 1999 in Dagestan, al-Walid was a relatively unknown figure outside of Chechnya.

After his incursion, his notoriety began to rise in Islamist circles abroad.

Second Chechen War 
In the Second Chechen War, al-Walid continued as Khattab's deputy to participate in raids and ambushes. In the spring of 2000, he achieved his most important military victories. On 29 February, he led the Battle of Ulus-Kert. His forces engaged and surrounded an entire company of the VDV 76th Guards Air Assault Division from Pskov. The battle lasted for several days and eventually resulted in the total annihilation of the Russian company. The separatist news agency Chechenpress reported that only 12 Chechen rebels had been killed in the battle, while Russian sources estimated their losses at up to 300 men. In April 2000, al-Walid successfully attacked the VDV 51st Guards Parachute Landing Regiment from Tula.

In the summer of 2001, the late Aslan Maskhadov, then president of the Chechen Republic of Ichkeria, appointed Abu al-Walid commander of the Eastern front.

After Khattab's death on 20 March 2002, al-Walid assumed command of the IIB. Soon afterwards he released an article through the foreign Mujahideen's official website al-Qoqaz, in which he explained the circumstances surrounding Khattab's death. The release of this article also confirmed that he had taken command of the IIB. Later he also issued a video-statement, in which he commented on the death of his predecessor.

On 9 April 2002, al-Walid announced that his forces had shot down the Mil Mi-24 'Hind' gunship and taken its three-man crew prisoner. It had been reported missing for two months. He released the serial number of the helicopter and detailed information about the crew members. On 16 May he issued an ultimatum to the Russian military authorities: threatening to kill the three prisoners if the Russians failed to release 20 Chechens being held in Russian prisons. The Russians did not comply. The online Chechen Islamist news agency, Kavkaz Center, claimed it has unconfirmed information that the crew had been executed.

Death 
Al-Walid was killed by members of Sulim Yamadaev's Special Battalion "Vostok" (East) in Chechnya on 16 April 2004. Although there are several versions of the circumstances, the most extensive account is derived from a letter written by Abu Hafs al-Urduni, who assumed command of the Chechen Mujahideen. He said that al-Walid was "on tour to all regiments to task them with operations and logistical plans." Members of his party were captured in the village of Tsa-Vedeno, and pro-Moscow security forces determined "his position in a nearby forest".

After heavy bombardment of the area, snipers ambushed and killed al-Walid. Abu al-Walid's brother Ali Al Ghamdi said that Abu al-Walid was ambushed and shot by the Russian Special Forces in the forest near the village of Tsa-Vedeno. Ali said that Abu al-walid's companions were able to hide his body from the Russian forces in the forest then buried him later.
He also said that the information about Abu Al-Walid's being betrayed were wrong and that his brother was shot in a fight with the Russian forces.
Abu al-Walid's will was not to be filmed after his death. Vladimir Putin rewarded Yamadaev as a Hero of the Russian Federation at the Kremlin in the summer of 2005.

Allegations of terrorism 
Russian authorities often accused Khattab, al-Walid and other Arabs fighting in Chechnya, of involvement in terrorism. According to the FSB, Al-Walid was responsible for several terrorist attacks, including the 1999 apartment bombings, the 2002 Kaspiysk bombing, and planned but never executed bacteriological attacks on Russia. He and Shamil Basayev were also accused of organizing the suicide-bombing of the Chechen Republic's Government headquarters in Grozny on 27 December 2002.

Only Basayev claimed responsibility for the latter attack, but Russian officials asserted that the "Arab methods" suggested that it was done by "Arab militants trained in Afghanistan". Al-Walid has been accused of being an agent of al-Qaeda, the Muslim Brotherhood, and Saudi Intelligence. He never responded to such allegations, and never claimed responsibility for any of these terrorist attacks. He never admitted to being a member of al-Qaeda, the Muslim Brotherhood, or Saudi Intelligence.

Al-Walid did comment on other acts of terrorism. On 11 June 2003, the London-based Arabic newspaper Asharq Al-Awsat reported on a statement he had released through the al-Qoqaz News Agency. He encouraged the Iraqi insurgents to carry out suicide operations. He was quoted as saying; "According to [my] experience in the Caucasus, such operations will have an effect on American and British troops".

On 19 November 2003, the Qatar-based Arabic television network Al-Jazeera broadcast a video statement in which al-Walid commented on suicide bombings by Chechen women; he claimed the attacks were motivated by fear of rape and brutality by Russian soldiers. A translation of this statement is available on BBC Monitoring; he was quoted as saying; "These women, particularly the wives of the Mujahideen who were martyred, are being threatened in their homes, their honour and everything are being threatened. They do not accept being humiliated and living under occupation. They say that they want to serve the cause of Almighty God and avenge the death of their husbands and persecuted people".

On 13 March 2004, one day before the Russian presidential election, al-Walid released another video statement broadcast by Al-Jazeera. He commented on the Russian strategy of dropping mines in the forested areas from which the Chechen insurgents are carrying out their guerrilla war against the Federal Armed Forces and their Chechen collaborators. He was quoted as saying the following;

"The enemies of God drop mines in the forests and God willing, we will return them to the Russians and they will find them on their land and in the midst of their families. (…) But perhaps we may wait a little to see the upcoming elections. If they elect someone who declares war on Chechnya, then the Russians are declaring war against the Chechens and by God we will send them these [mines]... Not only these but also things that did not cross their minds. (…) We will return these to you [Russians]… You will, God willing, see hundreds of people crippled". 

The Emirs of the Chechen Mujahideen have helped acquire and distribute funds provided by wealthy, Salafist charities, such as al-Haramein. But there has not been solid evidence of links to al-Qaeda or other international terrorist organizations.

See also 
 Abu Zaid Al-Kuwaiti

References

External links 
Articles
 (The Jamestown Foundation’s Chechnya Weekly) The Rise and Fall of Foreign Fighters in Chechnya
 (The Sunday Times) Saudi warlord leads Russian bombers

Websites
 www.alqoqaz.net (the foreign Mujahideen’s online news agency) (Arabic)

Video
 Biography of Khattab Part 2
 

1967 births
2004 deaths
Foreign volunteers in Chechnya
Islamic terrorism in Russia
Abu Al-Walid
Saudi Arabian Sunni Muslims
Saudi Arabian Salafis
Warlords
Salafi jihadists